Mbo Jérôme Mpenza (born 4 December 1976) is a Belgian former professional football player and coach, who played as a striker. He was capped by Belgium at international level, scoring three goals in 56 appearances. His younger brother, Émile, is also a former footballer who represented Belgium.

Club career
During the start of his career, Mbo shared clubs with Émile, until he eventually left Standard Liège for Sporting CP, where he won the 2000 league championship as a January transfer. He was once nicknamed Monsieur Un But Par Match (Mr. One-Goal-A-Match) for his regular club scoring exploits. Had an uneventful stint in Turkey, playing almost no part in Galatasaray's season during the first part of 2001–02. He subsequently returned to Belgium, and served second stints with R.E. Mouscron (one half season) and R.S.C. Anderlecht (four).

In July 2008, Mpenza joined Greek Super League outfit AEL FC. On 8 December 2008, he announced his retirement due to a back-injury. At this time he had not played a game for the club yet, due to the same injury.

International career
Mpenza also played for the Belgium national team from 1997, for which he scored his first goal in a friendly against Greece in August 2005. He represented his adopted nation in two World Cups and in UEFA Euro 2000, held in his country and the Netherlands (with brother Émile in the final squads for 1998 and 2000's competitions). He collected 56 caps (66 selections).

After football
Mpenza works at Anderlecht as a scout following his retirement.

Honours 
Sporting CP
 Portuguese First Division: 1999–2000

Anderlecht
 Belgian First Division: 2005–06, 2006–07
 Belgian Cup: 2007–08
 Belgian Super Cup: 2006, 2007

Belgium
 FIFA Fair Play Trophy: 2002 World Cup

References

External links

Belgian footballers
Belgium international footballers
Belgium youth international footballers
Democratic Republic of the Congo footballers
Belgian people of Democratic Republic of the Congo descent
1998 FIFA World Cup players
2002 FIFA World Cup players
Belgian expatriate sportspeople in Portugal
Belgian expatriate sportspeople in Turkey
Belgian Pro League players
Challenger Pro League players
Belgian expatriate footballers
Democratic Republic of the Congo emigrants to Belgium
Expatriate footballers in Portugal
Expatriate footballers in Turkey
Association football forwards
Galatasaray S.K. footballers
K.V. Kortrijk players
Naturalised citizens of Belgium
Footballers from Brussels
Footballers from Kinshasa
Primeira Liga players
R.E. Mouscron players
Standard Liège players
R.S.C. Anderlecht players
Sporting CP footballers
UEFA Euro 2000 players
1976 births
Living people
Athlitiki Enosi Larissa F.C. players
Black Belgian sportspeople